Barrio de la Concepción is a station on Madrid Metro Line No. 7 in the district of Ciudad Lineal.

It is also near the M-30 motorway and ten minutes from Madrid-Barajas Airport. The station opened to the public on 17 May 1975 with the second section of the line between Pueblo Nuevo and Avenida de América and was renovated in 2006 to change the vaults and walls.

References 

Line 7 (Madrid Metro) stations
Railway stations in Spain opened in 1975
Buildings and structures in Ciudad Lineal District, Madrid